IK Östria Lambohov was a Swedish football club located in Linköping in Östergötland County.

Background
Idrottsklubben Östria Lambohov were founded on 24 January 1937 as Klints IK and in September of the same year changed their name to Bjärka Säby Östra IK.

Since their foundation IK Östria Lambohov participated mainly in the middle and lower divisions of the Swedish football league system.  The club's last season was in Division 3 Nordöstra Götaland which is the fifth tier of Swedish football. They play their home matches at the Lambohovsvallen in Linköping.

IK Östria Lambohov were affiliated to Östergötlands Fotbollförbund. The club currently has around 1,500 members of which about 700 are active players.  The club runs teams throughout the age groups from the youngest (Soccer for fun) through to the men's and ladies senior sides. The catchment area for the youth section is essentially Lambohov, Slaka and Skeda.

In 2013 the team merged with BK Kenty to form AFK Linköping. In 2018 the team was re-founded.

Recent history
In recent seasons IK Östria Lambohov have competed in the following divisions:

Season to season

Attendances

In recent seasons IK Östria Lambohov have had the following average attendances:

Footnotes

External links
 IK Östria Lambohov – Official website
 IK Östria Lambohov on Facebook
 SvenskaFans.com | IK Östria Lambohov – at SvenskaFans.com

Football clubs in Östergötland County
Association football clubs established in 1937
1937 establishments in Sweden